Dick Kauma (born 1 March 1988) is an international footballer for New Caledonia. He played in the 2012 OFC Nations Cup.

Honours

New Caledonia national football team 
 2012 OFC Nations Cup runners-up.

References

1988 births
Living people
New Caledonian footballers
New Caledonia international footballers
2012 OFC Nations Cup players
Association footballers not categorized by position